Johnson Spire is a mountain with a spire-like summit, rising to  between Cranfield Icefalls and Gaussiran Glacier in the northeast of the Britannia Range, Antarctica. It was named by the Advisory Committee on Antarctic Names after Bradish F. Johnson, Chief of the Optical Science Laboratory at the United States Geological Survey (USGS), with responsibility for calibrating aerial mapping cameras used in Antarctica. He conducted GPS observations during the USGS – Ohio State University Transantarctic Mountains Deformation Project in the summer of 1999–2000.

References

Mountains of Oates Land